Dominik Uher (born 31 December 1992) is a Czech professional ice hockey forward. He is currently playing with Fischtown Pinguins of the Deutsche Eishockey Liga (DEL). Uher was selected by the Pittsburgh Penguins in the 5th round (144th overall) of the 2011 NHL Entry Draft. He played two games for the Penguins in 2014–15, and spent several other years with the team's American Hockey League (AHL) affiliate, the Wilkes-Barre/Scranton Penguins.

Playing career
Uher played three seasons with the Spokane Chiefs from 2009–2012. He helped lead the Czech Republic to a fifth-place finish at the 2012 World Junior Ice Hockey Championships. Prior to the 2012–13 season, Uher signed a three-year entry-level contract with the Penguins to begin his professional career.

On 1 June 2016, Uher left the Penguins organization as an impending restricted free agent in returning to the Czech Republic to sign a contract with HC Sparta Praha of the ELH.

Personal

His father is the Czech mountain climber, Libor Uher.

Career statistics

International

References

External links
 

1992 births
Living people
Czech ice hockey centres
Fischtown Pinguins players
People from Frýdek-Místek
Pittsburgh Penguins draft picks
Pittsburgh Penguins players
HC Sparta Praha players
Spokane Chiefs players
Sportspeople from Ostrava
Wheeling Nailers players
Wilkes-Barre/Scranton Penguins players
Czech expatriate ice hockey players in the United States
Czech expatriate ice hockey players in Germany
Naturalized citizens of Germany